The Volkswagen Taos is a compact crossover SUV produced by the German automobile manufacturer Volkswagen. It was first released in October 2018 as the Volkswagen Tharu in China, while the Taos was released in October 2020 as a restyled version of the Tharu for the North America, South America, and Russia. The vehicle is positioned below the Tiguan, and in South America and China above the T-Cross.

The Taos is named after a small town in New Mexico to pay tribute to its former resident John Muir, who authored a repair book and manual dedicated to past Volkswagen models. The Tharu name is derived after the eponymous Tharu people, an ethnic group indigenous to Nepal and Northern India.

Overview 
The Taos/Tharu is based on the Volkswagen Group MQB A1, with its platform closely related and several sheet metals shared with the SEAT Ateca, Škoda Karoq and the Jetta VS5. Known as the 'Project Tarek' during development, the Taos/Tharu is considered the first Chinese-developed VW product that is sold outside China. Volkswagen's brand sales chief Jürgen Stackmann said the project "turned from a regional project into a global project." Global annual sales for the vehicle were projected at 400,000 units.

Markets

North America 
In the North American market, the Taos was revealed on 13 October 2020 for the 2022 model year. It is the fifth new addition to the Volkswagen SUV family in the last four years. The Mexican-built Taos slots directly below the Tiguan, which is solely available in a long-wheelbase guise in the market, while also acts as an indirect replacement to the discontinued Golf. The positioning made the Taos being dubbed as a subcompact crossover SUV by journalists.

Front-wheel-drive models feature an 8-speed automatic transmission, while the 4Motion all-wheel drive is coupled with a 7-speed DSG transmission.

Volkswagen's Digital Cockpit system is standard on all trims, replacing the physical instrument cluster dials with a reconfigurable 12.3-inch display. The Taos can function as a Wi-Fi hotspot and is available with a wireless charge pad. All but the base model feature an 8.0-inch touchscreen and the latest MIB3 infotainment software. Volkswagen sells the Taos in S, SE, and SEL trims.

The Taos for the Mexican market is powered by a 1.4-liter 4-cylinder turbocharged gasoline engine from the Volkswagen EA211 TSI engine family paired with a 6-speed automatic transmission. In Mexico, the Taos is available in Trendline, Comfortline, and Highline trims. All trims are only available in FWD drivetrain configuration.

South America 
Introduced on 13 October 2020, the vehicle is also sold as the Taos with an identical styling to the North American Taos. For this market, the vehicle is produced in General Pacheco plant in Argentina. It occupies a segment between the T-Cross and Tiguan. It is the first C-segment SUV made in Argentina. The engine is coupled with a 6-speed automatic transmission.

As of 2022, the Argentine version contains 20% locally-made parts. 70% of its production is exported.

Russia 
The Russian-market Taos was announced on 4 March 2021. It is assembled in Nizhny Novgorod by GAZ alongside the similar Škoda Karoq. As the result, the Taos for the Russian market uses an identical rear quarter panel and chassis from the Karoq, making it shorter in length and wheelbase compared to the Americas-market Taos and the Chinese-market Tharu, and requiring a different tailgate panel, rear taillights and rear bumper to be installed.

Engine options available are 1.6-litre MPI producing  and 1.4-litre TSI producing . The base engine comes with a 5-speed manual or 6-speed automatic transmission and front-wheel drive, while the TSI is mated to either an 8-speed automatic for the FWD version or a 7-speed DSG transmission with 4Motion AWD. The range will include Respect, Status and Exclusive trim levels.

Powertrain

China (Tharu) 
The Tharu was presented as a near production model called the 'Powerful Family SUV' in March 2018. Built by SAIC Volkswagen, the vehicle became available in China in late October 2018. The vehicle is assembled in three locations, including in Xinjiang Uygur Autonomous Region in the city of Ürümqi.

It is offered with several powertrain options, including one electric version called the e-Tharu. The base model of the Tharu has a torsion axis, the higher versions have a multi link suspension.

Volkswagen cooperated with the headphone manufacturer Beats Electronics to incorporate the Beats audio system in the vehicle.

Powertrain

e-Tharu 
The electric version of the Tharu was released in November 2020. Driven at a constant speed of 60 km/h (37 mph), the e-Tharu is claimed to be able to travel  between charges.

Safety
The Taos has ventilated front disc brakes and solid rear ones.

Latin NCAP
The Latin American Taos with 6 airbags, airbag switch, UN127 pedestrian safety standard, ESC, ISA, full SBR, and optional collision avoidance system received 5 stars from Latin NCAP in 2021 under its new protocol (similar to Euro NCAP 2014).

IIHS
The 2022 Taos was tested by the IIHS:

Sales

References

External links 

 Official website (United States)

Taos
Compact sport utility vehicles
Crossover sport utility vehicles
Front-wheel-drive vehicles
All-wheel-drive vehicles
Latin NCAP small off-road
Cars introduced in 2020